Lake Winneshiek is the name given to that portion of Navigation Pool 9 impounded by Lock and Dam No. 9 between the dam to 4 miles south of the city of Lansing, Iowa on the Upper Mississippi River, near Ferryville, Wisconsin. It encompasses about 6,000 acres (24 km²) and is part of the Upper Mississippi River National Wildlife and Fish Refuge. The Army Corps of Engineers has proposed constructing some islands in the lake in order to improve wildlife habitat.

See also
Wexford Creek

Notes

Lakes of the Mississippi River
Bodies of water of Allamakee County, Iowa
Bodies of water of Crawford County, Wisconsin
Reservoirs in Iowa
Reservoirs in Wisconsin